Urspelerpes is a monotypic genus of salamanders in the family Plethodontidae (the lungless salamanders). It is represented by a single species, the patch-nosed salamander (Urspelerpes brucei), a lungless miniature salamander found in streams of Georgia and South Carolina, United States. It marks the first discovery of an endemic amphibian genus from the United States since the Red Hills salamander (Phaeognathus) in 1961.

Description
This genus is believed to be closely related to brook salamanders (genus Eurycea), but have five toes on their feet. A distinctive characteristic is a yellowish patch on the snout. Males and females have different coloration, with males having a pair of dark stripes running down their bodies, with yellow backs, and females being more muted in color (a more common trait in birds). Similar to other salamander species, this genus is believed to eat small terrestrial prey using its projectile tongue.

Distribution and habitat
The description of the species, published online in June 2009, for the Journal of Zoology, was based on specimens collected at Stephens County, Georgia, (near Toccoa) in 2007, and several other sites in a region rich in salamander species. U. brucei is endemic to the United States and is its second-smallest salamander.

Etymology
The name Urspelerpes means "archaic" (ur) and "cave creeper" (spelerpes) in Ancient Greek. The specific epithet brucei honors a professor at Western Carolina University, Richard Bruce.

References

External links

 Urspelerpes images, Caudata Culture

Plethodontidae
Monotypic amphibian genera
Endemic fauna of the United States
Amphibians of the United States
Fauna of the Southeastern United States
Natural history of Georgia (U.S. state)
Natural history of South Carolina
Amphibians described in 2009